This article lists the latest women's squads lists for badminton's 2020 Badminton Asia Team Championships. Ranking stated are based on world ranking date for 4 February 2020 as per tournament's prospectus.

Group W
Group W consists of Japan, 
and Malaysia.

Japan

Malaysia

Group X
Group X consists of Korea, 
and Kazakhstan.

Korea

Kazakhstan

Group Y
Group Y consists of Thailand, 
Indonesia, 
and Philippines.

Thailand

Indonesia

Philippines

Group Z
Group Z consists of Chinese Taipei, 
and Singapore.

Chinese Taipei

Singapore

References

2020 Badminton Asia Team Championships